Marie Solberg (born 6 June 1988) is a Norwegian sailor from Sarpsborg. She took part in the 2012 Summer Paralympics in London in the Sonar class and won a bronze medal together with Per Eugen Kristiansen and Aleksander Wang-Hansen. She works as a graphic designer and graduated from Høgskolen i Østfold, 
Halden.

In January 2012 Team Sonar Norway, which she is a part of, won the World Sailing Championships in their class in Florida. She joined the team in 2009 and her best performance was the medal at the Summer Paralympics in 2012.

References

External links
 Marie Solberg at kappseiling.no
 Bronse i Paralympics. Article in sa.no
 Picture at eurosport.yahoo.com

Norwegian disabled sportspeople
Norwegian female sailors (sport)
People from Sarpsborg
1988 births
Living people
Sportspeople from Viken (county)